YourTV was a television channel owned by Fox Networks Group, a unit of Walt Disney Direct-to-Consumer and International. It began broadcasting on 1 October 2015 in the United Kingdom and Ireland.

History

On 3 September 2015, Fox International Channels announced they were going to launch a new, free-to-air channel in the UK. YourTV promised "sensational real-life stories, irresistible experiences and thrilling tales".

The channel launched on 1 October 2015 on Freeview, YouView, Freesat and Sky. It launched on Virgin Media on channel 218 on 21 July 2018. YourTV +1 was also launched on 1 October 2015 on Freeview channel 78 but only broadcast for a couple of hours. It moved to 73 a while later before being removed. YourTV continued its programming as a regular channel. However, in 2019, Disney decided to consolidate YourTV's programming into the main Fox channel's schedule, with the channel closing down at 12pm on 27 September 2019 with its Sky slot being taken by Sky Two.

Final programming

The last shows to be shown on  YourTV were Sea Patrol and Body of Proof (with the first episode of Body of Proof season two being the very last programme scheduled between 11am - 12pm)

 Baking Good, Baking Bad
 Behind Mansion Walls
 Body of Proof
 Bones
 Castle
 Corrupt Crimes
 Cruise Ship Diaries
 Derek Acorah's Ghost Towns
 Don't Tell the Bride
 Law & Order
 Murder She Solved
 Murderous Affairs
 On the Case
 Past Hunters
 Rescue: Special Ops
 Sea Patrol
 Shark
 Killer Couples
 The Mentalist
 The Real NCIS
 The Republic of Doyle
 Valentine Warner's Wild Table

See also
ABC1 (UK and Irish TV channel) - another former Freeview channel (also closed by Disney)

References

English-language television stations in the United Kingdom
Disney television networks
Television channels and stations established in 2015
Television channels and stations disestablished in 2019